Hoyas is an EP from American musician S. Carey. It was released in May 2012 under Jagjaguwar Records.

Track listing

Personnel
S. Carey - Primary Artist, Composer
Ben Lester - Composer, Drums
Nick Ball - Guitar
Andy Hofer - Trombone
Brian Joseph - Mixing
Daniel Murphy - Design

References

External links

Hoyas by S. Carey at iTunes.com

2012 EPs
Jagjaguwar albums
S. Carey albums